The Municipality of Mirna Peč is a municipality in southeast Slovenia, located in the traditional region of Lower Carniola. The seat of the municipality, which was established in 1998, is Mirna Peč. With an estimated population of 2,800, the municipality is included in the Southeast Slovenia Statistical Region.

Geography
The municipality lies at the junction of the Dinaric Alps, the Pannonian Basin, and the Alps, making shallow carbonate bedrocks, in particular limestone, the prevailing substratum. The predominantly hilly landscape with frequent karst features consists of three valleys: the Igmanca Valley, the Temenica Valley, and the Globodol Polje.

The Igmanca Valley
The Igmanca Valley northeast of Mirna Peč is bounded by Šentjurij Peak to the south, Snakaš Hill to the west, and Mount Poljane (with the highest peak at 477 m) and Plešivica Hill to the northeast. Although white or gray Jurassic limestone is most common, the northeast slope is covered with brown marl and red limestone from the Cretaceous period. There are five karst caves on its slopes, the largest one being Giant's House Cave on Plešivica Hill.

The valley, with an elevation of about 260 m, contains a shallow aquifer with a limited groundwater supply. Igmanca Creek, also known as Poljane Creek, surfaces and disappears underground twice along the valley. Karst features such as small swallow holes, estavelles, and, to a lesser extent, an outcrop of carbonate rock are also present.

The Temenica Valley
South of Saint Anne Hill, the Temenica River surfaces below a 35 m cliff at Zijalo. The initially narrow river valley gradually stretches into the undulating terraced countryside east of Golobinjek Hill. The river meanders through the floodplain at Mirna Peč and disappears beneath the surface in the swallow holes at Goriška Vas. Due to seasonal flooding in spring and autumn, fertile alluvial soil along the river bank is spread across the valley. Loam and clay deposits cover the surrounding hillsides.

The Temenica River is preserved as an ecological important area due to its unique and characteristic natural features, including varied riverside biodiversity, and the network of karst springs at Zijalo is listed as a site of local importance and a special conservation area.

The Globodol Polje
Globodol is a dry polje surrounded by an 80 to 120 m higher oval ridge to the north and the Ajdovec Plateau to the south, Koprivnica Hill to the west and Golobinjek Hill to the east. Its bottom at an elevation of 200 m is 4 km long and 1 km wide, covered mostly with red clay and rendzina. At its eastern and western edges are deep dolines, through which at water rises during flooding and later sinks. Caves on the slopes of surrounding hillsides give evidence of an ancient outflow; however, at present water supply is limited to groundwater aquifers.

Due to varied species of wild fauna and flora as well as natural habitat types, Koprivnica Hill, the Ajdovec Plateau, and Sluga Cave are listed as areas protected under the Natura 2000 Act.

Settlements
In addition to the municipal seat of Mirna Peč, the municipality also includes the following settlements:

 Biška Vas
 Čemše
 Dolenja Vas pri Mirni Peči
 Dolenji Globodol
 Dolenji Podboršt
 Globočdol
 Golobinjek
 Gorenji Globodol
 Gorenji Podboršt
 Goriška Vas
 Grč Vrh
 Hmeljčič
 Hrastje pri Mirni Peči
 Jablan
 Jelše
 Jordankal
 Malenska Vas
 Mali Kal
 Mali Vrh
 Orkljevec
 Poljane pri Mirni Peči
 Selo pri Zagorici
 Šentjurij na Dolenjskem
 Srednji Globodol
 Veliki Kal
 Vrhovo pri Mirni Peči
 Vrhpeč

References

External links

Municipality of Mirna Peč on Geopedia
Municipality of Mirna Peč

Mirna Pec
1998 establishments in Slovenia